Craig Fleer is an Australian rules football umpire currently officiating in the Australian Football League.

He joined the South Australian National Football League in 2004, umpiring in the 2015 Grand Final. He was appointed to the AFL list in 2012 and made his debut in Round 4 of that year, in a match between  Melbourne and the Western Bulldogs. He left the AFL list at the end of the 2014 season, but returned in 2016.

In 2020, he was selected to umpire his first AFL Grand Final.

References

Living people
Australian Football League umpires
Year of birth missing (living people)